George Bawa Singh (May 1937 – 9 March 1999) was a Belizean judge who served as Chief Justice of the Supreme Court in 1998 and as a Puisne Justice of the Supreme Court from 1991 to 1998.  He previously served as Solicitor General and Director of Public Prosecutions.

Early life 
Singh was born in May 1937.  His father Bawa Singh Mann was a Sikh who had immigrated from India in the 1930s.  Singh himself converted to Christianity.  He graduated from Wesley College in 1954.  That same year, he wrote three poems: "Dawn", "Dusk", and "Soliloquy of a Murderer".  He received the Gold Medal for the last one in a national poetry competition.

Career 
After his graduation, Singh briefly worked as a primary school teacher before joining the public service in 1955.  Starting as a clerk, he eventually became a customs inspector.  Looking for a change in career, Singh entered the Norman Manley Law School in Jamaica, where he graduated in 1978. Singh held the posts of Solicitor General and Director of Public Prosecutions, and later played a significant role in the establishment of the Family Court, on which he also served as its first judge. In 1991 he was named a Justice of the Supreme Court. He was sworn in as Chief Justice on 2 February 1998, along with Supreme Court Puisne Justices Manuel Sosa and John Rivero. He took up the CJ position at a busy time, when there were plans to add two temporary justices from Australia to help with processing the sizeable number of civil cases before the court. However, due to Singh's failing health, PM Manuel Esquivel transferred him to a less-demanding position as a judge of the Court of Appeal on 26 August 1998, naming Manuel Sosa as the new CJ.  The timing of this decision was criticised by the opposition during the 1998 election campaign.

Family
Singh was married and had three sons, two daughters, and five grandchildren. Among his sons is former Minister of Police Douglas Singh and former CEO of Trade and Investments for Belize, Michael Singh.

Death 
Singh died of a long-term illness on 9 March 1999.

References

1937 births
1999 deaths
Belizean Christians
Belizean people of Indian descent
Chief justices of Belize
Converts to Christianity from Sikhism
Directors of Public Prosecutions of Belize
People associated with the Norman Manley Law School
Solicitors-General of Belize